Nati Meir (born 23 May 1955) is a Romanian politician and member of the Chamber of Deputies from 2004 to 2008. He became a member of the Chamber of Deputies on the lists of the Greater Romania Party (PRM), but from April 2005 he was an independent member.

References

1955 births
Living people
Romanian Jews
Members of the Chamber of Deputies (Romania)
People from Haifa
Romanian politicians convicted of crimes
Romanian white-collar criminals
Jewish Romanian politicians